The Guilty Office is the seventh studio album by New Zealand indie band, The Bats, released in New Zealand on 1 December 2008, and in the United States on 23 June 2009.

Recording and New Zealand release
Recording of The Guilty Office began on 25–26 August 2007 in the newly built National Grid Studio in Heathcote Valley, Christchurch. The band had a few songs prepared from a demo session earlier in 2007, as well as some new songs written by Robert Scott. Scott has said that the recording process was "...pretty much the same as the others. I had a big bunch of songs and the rest of the band chose the ones they liked and we got them into shape and put them down live in the studio." The tracks "Guilty Office" and "Two Lines" grew out of improvised jams. The rhythm tracks for the album were recorded by John Kelcher. Additional tracks and mixing and mastering were recorded by Paul Keen at Longfellow Studio, while the strings, harp and accordion parts were recorded by Mike McLeod at the Masonic Lodge in Port Chalmers.

The album was released in New Zealand by Arch Hill on 1 December 2008. The cover art is by band member Robert Scott.

The video for "Castle Lights" was filmed in London by Hector Hazard, whereas the first video, for "Like Water in Your Hand", was simply shots of light reflecting off water ripples.

International releases
The album was released internationally by the following labels:
 Australia – Mistletone
 Sweden – Kning Disk (limited edition of 450 numbered copies)
 United Kingdom and Europe – Yesboyicream
 United States – Hidden Agenda (23 June 2009)

Track listing

References

The Bats (New Zealand band) albums
2008 albums
Flying Nun Records albums